Voigt (mainly written Vogt, also Voight) is a German surname, and may refer to:

Alexander Voigt, German football player
Angela Voigt, East German long jumper
Christian August Voigt (1808–1890), Austrian anatomist  
Cynthia Voigt, author of books for young adults
Deborah Voigt, American opera singer
Edward Voigt, born in Bremen, Germany, former U.S. Representative from Wisconsin
Edwin Edgar Voigt, bishop
Ellen Bryant Voigt, German American poet
Erika Voigt, actress
Frank Voigt, musician; flute player in the 1970s progressive rock band Think
Frederick Augustus Voigt (1892–1957), British journalist and author of German descent
Friedrich Siegmund (Sigismund) Voigt (Voight) ( 1781 - 1850), German botanist and zoologist 
Georg Voigt, German historian
Harry Voigt, German Olympic athlete
Irma Voigt (1882–1953), Dean of Women at Ohio University 
Jaap Voigt (born 1941), Dutch field hockey player
Jack Voigt, baseball player
Jan Voigt, actor
Jens Voigt, professional road cyclist
Joachim Otto Voigt, a Danish and German botanist
Johannes Voigt, German historian and father of Georg(e)
Margarete Voigt-Schweikert (18887-1957), German composer and music critic
Margit Voigt, German mathematician
Philip Nolan Voigt, fictional character from Marvel Comics 
Stu Voigt, former NFL tight end
 (1838–1896), German painter and Royal Court photographer during the Wilhelmine Period
Udo Voigt, German ultra-conservative politician
Werner Voigt, German football coach and former player
Wilhelm Voigt (1849–1922), the "Hauptmann von Köpenick", German impostor
Woldemar Voigt (1850–1919), German physicist
Woldemar Voigt (engineer) (1907-1980), German engineer
Wolfgang Voigt, electronic music artist

See also
The Voigt profile, a peak function
The Voigt pipe, a type of loudspeaker 
Voigt notation, a way to represent Symmetric tensor 
Voight 
Vogt 
Vogt (surname) 
Voit (surname) 
Kelvin–Voigt material

German-language surnames
Jewish surnames
Occupational surnames